Gibbon is an unincorporated community in Benton County, Washington, United States, between Prosser and Benton City.

The community, primarily a railroad junction, was founded as Bender by the Northern Pacific Railway Company in 1884. In April 1896, Bender's name was changed to Gibbon in honor of U.S. Army General John Gibbon who died that same year.

References

Unincorporated communities in Benton County, Washington
Northern Pacific Railway
Unincorporated communities in Washington (state)